Kathleen Partridge (7 December 1963 – 13 September 2021) was an Australian field hockey player who competed in the 1988 Summer Olympics and in the 1992 Summer Olympics. Partridge debuted for Australia in 1985 making the Australian field hockey squad in 1982. She has received a Medal of the Order of Australia in 1989 and an Australian Sports Medal in 2000. All up, Partridge has attended five Olympics; two as a field hockey player (Barcelona, Vice Captain 5th,  Seoul, Gold ) and three in a coaching capacity as a specialist goalkeeping coach with the Hockeyroos. Partridge was appointed goalkeeping coach to work with Ric Charlesworth in 1995 through to 2000 and in that time the Hockeyroos won many gold medals including Olympic gold medals in Atlanta (1996) and Sydney (2000).

Kathleen attended

References

External links
 

1963 births
2021 deaths
Australian female field hockey players
Female field hockey goalkeepers
Olympic field hockey players of Australia
Field hockey players at the 1988 Summer Olympics
Field hockey players at the 1992 Summer Olympics
Olympic gold medalists for Australia
Olympic medalists in field hockey
Medalists at the 1988 Summer Olympics
20th-century Australian women